Alessandro Panza (born 15 May 1982 in Domodossola) is an Italian politician and Member of the European Parliament since 2019.

References

Living people
1982 births
MEPs for Italy 2019–2024
Lega Nord MEPs
Lega Nord politicians